Heliotropium anomalum is a species of flowering shrub in the borage family, Boraginaceae, that is native to the Hawaiian Islands, Guam, Christmas Island, Saipan, Tinian, Wake Island and New Caledonia. Common names include Polynesian heliotrope, Pacific heliotrope, Scrub heliotrope and hinahina kū kahakai (Hawaiian). H. a. var. argenteum is the official flower of the island Kahoolawe in Hawaii.

References

External links 
 
 

anomalum
Plants described in 1832
Flora of Hawaii
Flora of the Mariana Islands
Flora of Wake Island
Flora of Christmas Island
Flora of New Caledonia